Ray Gibbon Drive, referred to as the West Regional Road during proposal and planning stages, is a major arterial road in St. Albert, Alberta. Except for the Edmonton portion, it is only partially constructed as a two-lane road. It was named, at the official opening of Stage One in October 2007, after former mayor Ray Gibbon, who served from 1968 to 1974 and again in 1989. Gibbon died in 1999, but his wife and family were present for the official opening, riding in the vintage lead vehicle for the first use of the road.

Ray Gibbon Drive preceded in Edmonton as 184 Street, an arterial road which begins at 100 Avenue and travels north to Anthony Henday Drive.

Expansion history
Plans to extend and upgrade Ray Gibbon Drive have been steadily revised in Edmonton Capital Region Transportation Planning documents.

, construction had commenced on widening the road to a 4-lane expressway standard, as per requests in 2015 by St. Albert City Council instigated in its own transportation plan, approved by the Province of Alberta in 2019. Original plans for a freeway conversion were scrapped as it would cost too much.

Major intersections

Future
Throughout, St. Albert has maintained that it would simply be more cost efficient for it to service and maintain this small area, as the fragments are adjacent to serviced St. Albert land, while the natural barrier of the Anthony Henday Drive would make it less efficient for Edmonton to extend utility and other services. The fragments are located in a small northwest section of the Anthony Henday transportation utility corridor (adjacent to the north side of Anthony Henday Drive), adjacent to the south side of St. Albert, east of the southern-most  stretch of Ray Gibbon Drive owned and serviced by the City of Edmonton (see #Major intersections), and to the west and south of 137 Avenue NW.

See also 

 List of streets in Edmonton
 Transportation in Edmonton

References 

Roads in Edmonton
Roads in St. Albert, Alberta
Proposed roads in Canada